Alan Richard Day (born 12 November 1938) is a former English cricketer. He was a right-handed batsman.

Day was born in Muswell Hill in North London, and attended Aldenham School in Hertfordshire. He made his Minor Counties Championship debut in 1957 for Middlesex Second XI, playing two matches. He didn't play another match in the competition until 1962, when he joined Hertfordshire. He played regularly for Hertfordshire until 1975, and then for Berkshire from 1977 to 1980. He made his one-day debut in the 1966 Gillette Cup for Hertfordshire against Berkshire, and played five matches in total between 1966 and 1974. He top-scored with 53 when Hertfordshire beat Devon in the first round of the Gillette Cup in 1969.

Day's only first-class appearance came for Marylebone Cricket Club in 1968, against Ireland. He scored 5 runs in the match, which finished in a draw. He appeared frequently for MCC in minor matches. In club cricket for Hornsey Cricket Club and other cricket matches he scored more than 100 centuries.

References

External links
Alan Day at Cricket Archive 

1938 births
Living people
People from Muswell Hill
People educated at Aldenham School
English cricketers
Marylebone Cricket Club cricketers
Hertfordshire cricketers
Berkshire cricketers